Parlez-moi d'amour may refer to:

Music
 "Parlez-moi d'amour" (song), a 1930 French song by Jean Lenoir, considered a French standard, the classic recording sung by Lucienne Boyer
 "Parlez Moi D'Amour (Let's Talk About Love)" (song), a 1982 song by June Pointer off the eponymous album June Pointer

Film
 Speak to Me of Love (film), a 2002 French drama film starring Sophie Marceau
 Parlez-moi d'amour (film), a 1983 film by Patrick Conrad
 Speak to Me of Love (1975 film), a 1975 French drama film
 Che femmina... e che dollari! (film), also released as Parlez-moi d'amour, a 1961 film starring Dalida
 Speak to Me of Love (1935 film), a 1935 French comedy film

See also

 Let's Talk About Love (Parlez-nous d'amour), a 1976 film by Jean-Claude Lord
 
 Let's Talk About Love (disambiguation)
 Speak to me of love (disambiguation)